Apache MXNet is an open-source deep learning software framework, used to train and deploy deep neural networks. It is scalable, allowing for fast model training and supports a flexible programming model and multiple programming languages (including C++, Python, Java, Julia, MATLAB, JavaScript, Go, R, Scala, Perl, and Wolfram Language). The MXNet library is portable and can scale to multiple GPUs as well as multiple machines. It was co-developed by Carlos Guestrin at University of Washington (along with GraphLab).

Features
Apache MXNet is a scalable deep learning framework that supports deep learning models, such as; convolutional neural networks (CNNs) and long short-term memory networks (LSTMs).

Scalable
MXNet can be distributed on dynamic cloud infrastructure using a distributed parameter server (based on research at Carnegie Mellon University, Baidu, and Google). With multiple GPUs or CPUs the framework approaches linear scale.

Flexible
MXNet supports both imperative and symbolic programming. The framework allows developers to track, debug, save checkpoints, modify hyperparameters, and perform early stopping.

Multiple languages
MXNet supports Python, R, Scala, Clojure, Julia, Perl, MATLAB and JavaScript for front-end development, and C++ for back-end optimization.

Portable
Supports an efficient deployment of a trained model to low-end devices for inference, such as mobile devices (using Amalgamation), Internet of things devices (using AWS Greengrass), serverless computing (using AWS Lambda) or containers. These low-end environments can have only weaker CPU or limited memory (RAM), and should be able to use the models that were trained on a higher-level environment (GPU based cluster, for example).

Cloud Support 
MXNet is supported by public cloud providers including Amazon Web Services (AWS) and Microsoft Azure. Amazon has chosen MXNet as its deep learning framework of choice at AWS. Currently, MXNet is supported by Intel, Baidu, Microsoft, Wolfram Research, and research institutions such as Carnegie Mellon, MIT, the University of Washington, and the Hong Kong University of Science and Technology.

See also
 Comparison of deep learning software
 Differentiable programming

References

Deep learning software
Free statistical software
MXNet
Cross-platform free software
Software using the Apache license